Virgil Browne (born 9 September 1974) is a Nevisian cricketer. He played in six first-class and two List A matches for the Leeward Islands in 2003 and 2004, and in two Twenty20 matches for the Nevis cricket team in 2006.

See also
 List of Nevis Twenty20 cricketers
 List of Leeward Islands first-class cricketers

References

External links
 

1974 births
Living people
Nevisian cricketers
Leeward Islands cricketers